Alfred Bryan (1852–1899) (born as Charles Grineau) was a popular English illustrator, best known for his many contributions to the London-based weekly theatrical review Entr'acte.

Bryan's first professional sketches were published in The Hornsey Hornet. He also produced sketches for The London Figaro. Bryan worked for the Illustrated Sporting and Dramatic News for most of his career and was also published in periodicals such as Judy magazine. Walter Sickert, a contemporary art critic, described him as "the complete, trained draughtsman", praising his illustrations as "[...]unfaltering in their mastery of line, their perfect style, their elegance and wit."

Bryan was buried in New Southgate Cemetery, in Barnet, North London.

His son was Charles William Grineau (1883–1957), an artist known for his paintings of motorcars under the pseudonyms Bryan de Grineau and John Bryan.

Gallery

References

External links

Bryan on the National Portrait Gallery website

1852 births
1899 deaths
English illustrators